Rataje may refer to places:

Czech Republic
Rataje (Benešov District), a municipality and village in the Central Bohemian Region
Rataje (Kroměříž District), a municipality and village in the Zlín Region
Rataje (Tábor District), a municipality and village in the South Bohemian Region
Rataje, a village and part of Těšetice (Olomouc District) in the Olomouc Region
Rataje nad Sázavou, a market town in the Central Bohemian Region

Poland
Rataje, Poznań, a large residential area in Poznań
Rataje, Chodzież County in Greater Poland Voivodeship (west-central Poland)
Rataje, Grodzisk Wielkopolski County in Greater Poland Voivodeship (west-central Poland)
Rataje, Piła County in Greater Poland Voivodeship (west-central Poland)
Rataje, Września County in Greater Poland Voivodeship (west-central Poland)
Rataje, Lower Silesian Voivodeship (south-west Poland)
Rataje, Masovian Voivodeship (east-central Poland)
Rataje, Świętokrzyskie Voivodeship (south-central Poland)
Rataje, West Pomeranian Voivodeship (north-west Poland)

Serbia
Rataje (Vranje), in southern Serbia